The Battle of Videau's Bridge (also known as Smith's plantation) was an engagement of the American Revolutionary War fought on January 3, 1782 in Charles Town District, currently Berkeley County, South Carolina. The British routed an American force opposing a foraging expedition they sent from Charleston. The British claimed to kill 57 and capture 20 Americans.

Order of Battle
Patriots:
 400 men under the command of Col. Richard Richardson, Jr.
 Berkeley County Regiment of Militia detachment led by Col. Richard Richardson, Jr. with two known companies, led by:
Capt. William Capers
Capt. Gavin Witherspoon
South Carolina 3rd Regiment of State Dragoons (State Troops) detachment led by Major Samuel Cooper, with three known companies, led by:
Capt. William Bennett
Capt. George Sinclair Capers (wounded)
Capt. John Carraway Smith

British/Loyalists:
 360 men commanded by Major William Brereton
 British Regulars, Grenadiers & Light Infantry led by Major William Brereton
 NY Volunteers, Major John Coffin's Troop of Mounted Infantry led by Major John Coffin
 SC Royalists detachment led by Capt. Archibald Campbell (killed)
 Volunteers of Ireland led by Major John Doyle
 Independent Troop of Black Dragoons (Loyalists) led by Capt. March with Lt. Mingo

Notes

1782 in the United States
Berkeley County, South Carolina
History of Charleston, South Carolina
Conflicts in 1782
Videau's Bridge
Videau's Bridge
1782 in South Carolina
18th-century in Charleston, South Carolina